Guadeloupe is an archipelago and overseas department and region of France in the Caribbean. It consists of four inhabited islands—Basse-Terre, Grande-Terre, Marie-Galante, La Désirade, and the two inhabited Îles des Saintes—as well as many uninhabited islands and outcroppings. It is south of Antigua and Barbuda and Montserrat, north of the Commonwealth of Dominica. The region's capital city is Basse-Terre, located on the southern west coast of Basse-Terre Island; however, the most populous city is Les Abymes and the main centre of business is neighbouring Pointe-à-Pitre, both located on Grande-Terre Island. It had a population of 384,239 in 2019.

Like the other overseas departments, it is an integral part of France. As a constituent territory of the European Union and the Eurozone, the euro is its official currency and any European Union citizen is free to settle and work there indefinitely. However, as an overseas department, it is not part of the Schengen Area. The region formerly included Saint Barthélemy and Saint Martin, which were detached from Guadeloupe in 2007 following a 2003 referendum.

Christopher Columbus visited Guadeloupe in 1493, during his second voyage, and gave the island its name. The official language is French; Antillean Creole is also spoken.

Etymology 

The archipelago was called  (or "The Island of Beautiful Waters") by the native Arawak people.

Christopher Columbus named the island  in 1493 after Our Lady of Guadalupe, a shrine to the Virgin Mary venerated in the Spanish town of Guadalupe, Extremadura. When the area became a French colony, the Spanish name was retained - though altered to French orthography and phonology.

History

Pre-colonial era

The islands were first populated by indigenous peoples of the Americas, possibly as far back as 3000 BCE. The Arawak people are the first identifiable group, but they were later displaced circa 1400 CE by Kalina-Carib peoples.

15th–17th centuries
Christopher Columbus was the first European to see Guadeloupe, landing in November 1493 and giving it its current name. Several attempts at colonisation by the Spanish in the 16th century failed due to attacks from the native peoples. In 1626, the French under Pierre Belain d'Esnambuc began to take an interest in Guadeloupe, expelling Spanish settlers. The Compagnie des Îles de l'Amérique settled in Guadeloupe in 1635, under the direction of Charles Liénard de L'Olive and Jean du Plessis d'Ossonville; they formally took possession of the island for France and brought in French farmers to colonise the land. This led to the death of many indigenous people by disease and violence. By 1640, however, the Compagnie des Îles de l'Amérique had gone bankrupt, and they thus sold Guadeloupe to Charles Houël du Petit Pré who began plantation agriculture, with the first African slaves arriving in 1650. Slave resistance was immediately widespread, with an open uprising in 1656 lasting several weeks and a simultaneous spate of mass desertions that lasted at least two years until the French compelled indigenous peoples to stop assisting them. Ownership of the island passed to the French West India Company before it was annexed to France in 1674 under the tutelage of their Martinique colony. Institutionalised slavery, enforced by the Code Noir from 1685, led to a booming sugar plantation economy.

18th–19th centuries

During the Seven Years' War, the British captured and occupied the islands until the 1763 Treaty of Paris. During that time, Pointe-à-Pitre became a major harbour, and markets in Britain's North American colonies were opened to Guadeloupean sugar, which was traded for foodstuffs and timber. The economy expanded quickly, creating vast wealth for the French colonists. So prosperous was Guadeloupe at the time that, under the 1763 Treaty of Paris, France forfeited its Canadian colonies in exchange for the return of Guadeloupe. Coffee planting began in the late 1720s, also worked by slaves and, by 1775, cocoa had become a major export product as well.

The French Revolution brought chaos to Guadeloupe. Under new revolutionary law, freedmen were entitled to equal rights. Taking advantage of the chaotic political situation, Britain invaded Guadeloupe in 1794. The French responded by sending an expeditionary force led by Victor Hugues, who retook the islands and abolished slavery. More than 1,000 French colonists were killed in the aftermath.

In 1802, the French Consulate government reinstated the pre-revolutionary government and slavery, prompting a slave rebellion led by Louis Delgrès. The French authorities responded quickly, culminating in the Battle of Matouba on 28 May 1802. Realising they had no chance of success, Delgrès and his followers committed mass suicide by deliberately exploding their gunpowder stores. In 1810, the British captured the island again, handing it over to Sweden under the 1813 Treaty of Stockholm.

In the 1814 Treaty of Paris, Sweden ceded Guadeloupe to France, giving rise to the Guadeloupe Fund. In 1815, the Treaty of Vienna acknowledged French control of Guadeloupe.

Slavery was abolished in the French Empire in 1848. After 1854, indentured labourers from the French colony of Pondicherry in India were brought in. Emancipated slaves had the vote from 1849, but French nationality and the vote were not granted to Indian citizens until 1923, when a long campaign, led by Henry Sidambarom, finally achieved success.

20th–21st centuries
In 1936, Félix Éboué became the first black governor of Guadeloupe. During the Second World War Guadeloupe initially came under the control of the Vichy government, later joining Free France in 1943. In 1946, the colony of Guadeloupe became an overseas department of France.

Tensions arose in the post-war era over the social structure of Guadeloupe and its relationship with mainland France. The 'Massacre of St Valentine' occurred in 1952, when striking factory workers in Le Moule were shot at by the Compagnies républicaines de sécurité, resulting in four deaths. In May 1967 racial tensions exploded into rioting following a racist attack on a black Guadeloupean, resulting in eight deaths.

An independence movement grew in the 1970s, prompting France to declare Guadeloupe a French region in 1974. The Union populaire pour la libération de la Guadeloupe (UPLG) campaigned for complete independence, and by the 1980s the situation had turned violent with the actions of groups such as Groupe de libération armée (GLA) and Alliance révolutionnaire caraïbe (ARC).

Greater autonomy was granted to Guadeloupe in 2000. Through a referendum in 2003, Saint-Martin and Saint Barthélemy voted to separate from the administrative jurisdiction of Guadeloupe, this being fully enacted by 2007.

In January 2009, labour unions and others known as the Liyannaj Kont Pwofitasyon went on strike for more pay. Strikers were angry with low wages, the high cost of living, high levels of poverty relative to mainland France and levels of unemployment that are amongst the worst in the European Union. The situation quickly escalated, exacerbated by what was seen as an ineffectual response by the French government, turning violent and prompting the deployment of extra police after a union leader (Jacques Bino) was shot and killed. The strike lasted 44 days and had also inspired similar actions on nearby Martinique. President Nicolas Sarkozy later visited the island, promising reform. Tourism suffered greatly during this time and affected the 2010 tourist season as well.

Geography 

Guadeloupe is an archipelago of more than 12 islands, as well as islets and rocks situated where the northeastern Caribbean Sea meets the western Atlantic Ocean. It is located in the Leeward Islands in the northern part of the Lesser Antilles, a partly volcanic island arc. To the north lie Antigua and Barbuda and the British Overseas Territory of Montserrat, with Dominica lying to the south.

The two main islands are Basse-Terre (west) and Grande-Terre (east), which form a butterfly shape as viewed from above, the two 'wings' of which are separated by the Grand Cul-de-Sac Marin,  and Petit Cul-de-Sac Marin. More than half of Guadeloupe's land surface consists of the 847.8 km2 Basse-Terre. In contrast Grande-Terre is mostly flat, with rocky coasts to the north, irregular hills at the centre, mangrove at the southwest, and white sand beaches sheltered by coral reefs along the southern shore. This is where the main tourist resorts are found.

To the south lies the Îles de Petite-Terre, which are two islands (Terre de Haut and Terre de Bas) totalling 2 km2.

Les Saintes is an archipelago of eight islands of which two, Terre-de-Bas and Terre-de-Haut are inhabited. The landscape is similar to that of Basse-Terre, with volcanic hills and irregular shoreline with deep bays.

There are numerous other smaller islands.

Geology 
Basse-Terre is a volcanic island. The Lesser Antilles are at the outer edge of the Caribbean Plate, and Guadeloupe is part of the outer arc of the Lesser Antilles Volcanic Arc. Many of the islands were formed as a result of the subduction of oceanic crust of the Atlantic Plate under the Caribbean Plate in the Lesser Antilles subduction zone. This process is ongoing and is responsible for volcanic and earthquake activity in the region. Guadeloupe was formed from multiple volcanoes, of which only La Grande Soufrière is not extinct. Its last eruption was in 1976, and led to the evacuation of the southern part of Basse-Terre. 73,600 people were displaced throughout three and a half months following the eruption.

K–Ar dating indicates that the three northern massifs on Basse-Terre Island are 2.79 million years old. Sections of volcanoes collapsed and eroded within the last 650,000 years, after which the Sans Toucher volcano grew in the collapsed area. Volcanoes in the north of Basse-Terre Island mainly produced andesite and basaltic andesite. There are several beaches of dark or "black" sand.

La Désirade, east of the main islands, has a basement from the Mesozoic, overlaid with thick limestones from the Pliocene to Quaternary periods.

Grande-Terre and Marie-Galante have basements probably composed of volcanic units of Eocene to Oligocene, but there are no visible outcrops. On Grande-Terre, the overlying carbonate platform is 120 metres thick.

Climate 
The islands are part of the Leeward Islands, so called because they are downwind of the prevailing trade winds, which blow out of the northeast. This was significant in the days of sailing ships. Grande-Terre is so named because it is on the eastern, or windward side, exposed to the Atlantic winds. Basse-Terre is so named because it is on the leeward south-west side and sheltered from the winds. Guadeloupe has a tropical climate tempered by maritime influences and the Trade Winds. There are two seasons, the dry season called "Lent" from January to June, and the wet season called "winter", from July to December.

Tropical cyclones and storm surges 
Located in a very exposed region, Guadeloupe and its dependencies have to face many cyclones. The deadliest hurricane to hit Guadeloupe was the Pointe-à-Pitre hurricane of 1776, which killed at least 6,000 people.

On 16 September 1989, Hurricane Hugo caused severe damage to the islands of the archipelago and left a deep mark on the memory of the local inhabitants. In 1995, three hurricanes (Iris, Luis and Marilyn) hit the archipelago in less than three weeks.

Some of the deadliest hurricanes that have hit Guadeloupe are the following:

In the 20th century: 12 September 1928: 1928 Okeechobee hurricane; 11 August 1956: Hurricane Betsy; 22 August 1964: Hurricane Cleo; 27 September 1966: Hurricane Inez; 16–17 September 1989: Hurricane Hugo; 14–15 September 1995: Hurricane Marilyn.

In the 21st century: 6 September 2017: Hurricane Irma; 18–19 September 2017: Hurricane Maria.

Flora 

With fertile volcanic soils, heavy rainfall and a warm climate, vegetation on Basse-Terre is lush. Most of the islands' forests are on Basse-Terre, containing such species as mahogany, ironwood and chestnut trees. Mangrove swamps line the Salée River. Much of the forest on Grande-Terre has been cleared, with only a few small patches remaining.

Between  of altitude, the rainforest that covers a large part of the island of Basse-Terre develops. There we find the white gum tree, the acomat-boucan or chestnut tree, the marbri or bois-bandé or the oleander; shrubs and herbaceous plants such as the mountain palm, the balisier or ferns; many epiphytes: bromeliads, philodendrons, orchids and lianas. Above , the humid savannah develops, composed of mosses, lichens, sphagnum or more vigorous plants such as mountain mangrove, high altitude violet or mountain thyme.

The dry forest occupies a large part of the islands of Grande-Terre, Marie-Galante, Les Saintes, La Désirade and also develops on the leeward coast of Basse-Terre. The coastal forest is more difficult to develop because of the nature of the soil (sandy, rocky), salinity, sunshine and wind and is the environment where the sea grape, the mancenilla (a very toxic tree whose trunk is marked with a red line), the icaquier or the Coconut tree grow. On the cliffs and in the Arid zones are found cacti such as the cactus-cigar (Cereus), the prickly pear, the chestnut cactus, the "Tête à l'anglais" cactus and the aloes.

The Mangrove forest that borders some of Guadalupe's coasts is structured in three levels, from the closest to the sea to the farthest. Behind the mangrove, where the tide and salt do not penetrate, a swamp forest sometimes develops, unique in Guadeloupe. The representative species of this environment is the Mangrove-medaille.

Fauna 
Few terrestrial mammals, aside from bats and raccoons, are native to the islands. The introduced Javan mongoose is also present on Guadeloupe. Bird species include the endemic purple-throated carib and the Guadeloupe woodpecker. The waters of the islands support a rich variety of marine life.

However, by studying 43,000 bone remains from six islands in the archipelago, 50 to 70% of snakes and lizards on the Guadeloupe Islands became extinct after European colonists arrived, who had brought with them mammals such as cats, mongooses, rats, and raccoons, which might have preyed upon the native reptiles.

Environmental preservation 
In recent decades, Guadeloupe's natural environments have been affected by hunting and fishing, forest retreat, urbanization and suburbanization. They also suffer from the development of intensive crops (banana and sugar cane, in particular), which reached their peak in the years 1955–75. This has led to the following situation: seagrass beds and reefs have degraded by up to 50% around the large islands; mangroves and mantids have almost disappeared in Marie-Galante, Les Saintes and La Désirade; the salinity of the fresh water table has increased due to "the intensity of use of the layer"; and pollution of agricultural origin (pesticides and nitrogenous compounds).

In addition, the ChlEauTerre study, unveiled in March 2018, concludes that 37 different anthropogenic molecules (more than half of which come from residues of now-banned pesticides, such as chlordecone) were found in "79% of the watersheds analyzed in Grande-Terre and 84% in Basse-Terre." A report by the Guadeloupe Water Office notes that in 2019 there is a "generalized degradation of water bodies."

Despite everything, there is a will to preserve these environments whose vegetation and landscape are preserved in some parts of the islands and constitute a sensitive asset for tourism. These areas are partially protected and classified as ZNIEFF, sometimes with nature reserve status, and several caves are home to protected chiropterans.

The Guadalupe National Park was created on 20 February 1989. In 1992, under the auspices of UNESCO, the Biosphere Reserve of the Guadeloupe Archipelago (Réserve de biosphère de l'archipel de la Guadeloupe) was created. As a result, on 8 December 1993, the marine site of Grand Cul-de-sac was listed as a wetland of international importance. The island thus became the overseas department with the most protected areas.

Earthquakes and tsunamis 
The archipelago is crossed by numerous geological faults such as those of la Barre or la Cadoue, while in depth, in front of Moule and La Désirade begins the Désirade Fault, and between the north of Maria-Galante and the south of Grande-Terre begins the Maria Galante Fault. And it is because of these geological characteristics, the islands of the department of Guadeloupe are classified in zone III according to the seismic zoning of France and are subject to a specific risk prevention plan.

The 1843 earthquake in the Lesser Antilles is, to this day, the most violent earthquake known. It caused the death of more than a thousand people, as well as major damage in Pointe-à-Pitre.

On 21 November 2004, the islands of the department, in particular Les Saintes archipelago, were shaken by a violent earthquake that reached a magnitude of 6.3 on the Richter scale and caused the death of one person, as well as extensive material damage.

Demographics 

Guadeloupe recorded a population of 402,119 in the 2017 census. The population is mainly Afro-Caribbean. European, Indian (Tamil, Telugu, and other South Indians), Lebanese, Syrians, and Chinese are all minorities. There is also a substantial population of Haitians in Guadeloupe who work mainly in construction and as street vendors. Basse-Terre is the political capital; however, the largest city and economic hub is Pointe-à-Pitre.

The population of Guadeloupe has been decreasing by 0.8% per year since 2013. One third of the land is devoted to agriculture and all mountains are uninhabitable; this lack of space and shelter makes the population density even higher.

Major urban areas 

The most populous urban unit (agglomeration) is Pointe-à-Pitre-Les Abymes, which covers 11 communes and 65% of the population of the department. The three largest urban units are:

Health 
In 2011, life expectancy at birth was recorded at 77.0 years for males and 83.5 for females.

Medical centres in Guadeloupe include: University Hospital Centre (CHU) in Pointe-à-Pitre, Regional Hospital Centre (CHR) in Basse-Terre, and four hospitals located in Capesterre-Belle-Eau, Pointe-Noire, Bouillante and Saint-Claude.

The Institut Pasteur de la Guadeloupe, is located in Pointe-à-Pitre and is responsible for researching environmental hygiene, vaccinations, and the spread of tuberculosis and other mycobacteria.

Immigration 
The relative wealth of Guadeloupe contrasts with the extreme poverty of several islands in the Caribbean region, which makes the community an attractive place for the populations of some of these territories. In addition, other factors, such as political instability and natural disasters, explain this immigration. As early as the 1970s, the first illegal immigrants of Haitian origin arrived in Guadeloupe to meet a need for labour in the agricultural sector; alongside this Haitian immigration, which is more visible because it is more numerous, Guadeloupe has also seen the arrival and settlement of populations from the island of Dominica and the Dominican Republic. In 2005, the prefecture, which represents the State in Guadeloupe, reported figures of between 50,000 and 60,000 foreigners in the department.

Migration 
Created in 1963 by Michel Debré, Bumidom's objective was to "[...] contribute to the solution of demographic problems in the overseas departments". To this end, its missions were multiple: information for future emigrants, vocational training, family reunification and management of reception centres. At the time, this project was also seen as a means to diminish the influence of the West Indian independence movements, which were gaining strength in the 1960s.

Between 1963 and 1981, an estimated 16,562 Guadeloupeans emigrated to metropolitan France through Bumidom. And the miniseries Le Rêve français (The French Dream) sets out to recount some of the consequences of the emigration of West Indians and Reunionese to France.

An estimated 50,000 Guadeloupeans and Martinicans participated in the construction of the Panama Canal between 1904 and 1914. In 2014, it was estimated that there were between 60,000 and 70,000 descendants of these West Indians living in Panama. Other waves of migration to North America, especially to Canada, occurred at the beginning of the 20th century.

Governance
Together with Martinique, La Réunion, Mayotte and French Guiana, Guadeloupe is one of the overseas departments, being both a region and a department combined into one entity. It is also an outermost region of the European Union. The inhabitants of Guadeloupe are French citizens with full political and legal rights.

Legislative powers are centred on the separate departmental and regional councils. The elected president of the Departmental Council of Guadeloupe is currently Guy Losbar (1.7.2021); its main areas of responsibility include the management of a number of social and welfare allowances, of junior high school (collège) buildings and technical staff, and local roads and school and rural buses. The Regional Council of Guadeloupe is a body, elected every six years, consisting of a president (currently Ary Chalus) and eight vice-presidents. The regional council oversees secondary education, regional transportation, economic development, the environment, and some infrastructure, among other things.

Guadeloupe elects one deputy from one of each of the first, second, third, and fourth constituencies to the National Assembly of France. Three senators are chosen for the Senate of France by indirect election. For electoral purposes, Guadeloupe is divided into two arrondissements (Basse-Terre and Pointe-à-Pitre), and 21 cantons.

Most of the French political parties are active in Guadeloupe. In addition there are also regional parties such as the Guadeloupe Communist Party, the Progressive Democratic Party of Guadeloupe, the Guadeloupean Objective, the Pluralist Left, and United Guadeloupe, Solidary and Responsible.

The prefecture (regional capital) of Guadeloupe is Basse-Terre. Local services of the state administration are traditionally organised at departmental level, where the prefect represents the government.

Administrative divisions 
For the purposes of local government, Guadeloupe is divided into 32 communes. Each commune has a municipal council and a mayor. Revenues for the communes come from transfers from the French government, and local taxes. Administrative responsibilities at this level include water management, civil register, and municipal police.

Geopolitics 
From a geostrategic point of view, Guadeloupe is located in a central part of the Caribbean archipelago between the Atlantic Ocean and the Caribbean Sea. This location in the region allows France to reach a large part of the eastern coast of the American continent. The exclusive economic zone formed by Guadeloupe and Martinique covers just over 126,146 square kilometres. In 1980 France established its maritime boundaries in the area by signing a Treaty with Venezuela. This provides France with important fishing resources.This offers France important fishing resources and independence to develop a sovereign policy of underwater research and protection (protection of humpback whales, Cousteau reserve, protection of coral reefs). Because of its geographical position, Guadeloupe allows France to participate in political and diplomatic dialogues at both the regional (Lesser and Greater Antilles) and continental (Latin and North America) levels.

The signing of the Regional Convention for the Internationalisation of Enterprise (CRIE), membership of the Economic Commission for Latin America and the Caribbean (ECLAC) and membership of the Association of Caribbean States (ACS) are milestones that have enabled Guadeloupe to develop its bilateral or multilateral relations within the framework of international agreements or institutions.11 The development of bilateral and multilateral economic partnerships with other Caribbean and American states is based on the modernisation of the autonomous port of Guadeloupe and the importance of the Guadeloupe-Polo Caribe international airport.

Symbols and flags
As a part of France, Guadeloupe uses the French tricolour as its flag and La Marseillaise as its anthem. However, a variety of other flags are also used in an unofficial or informal context, most notably the sun-based flag. Independentists also have their own flag.

Economy 

The economy of Guadeloupe depends on tourism, agriculture, light industry and services. It is reliant upon mainland France for large subsidies and imports and public administration is the largest single employer on the islands. Unemployment is especially high among the youth population.

In 2017, the Gross domestic product (GDP) of Guadeloupe was €9.079 billion, and showed 3.4% growth. The GDP per capita of Guadeloupe was €23,152. Imports amounted to €3.019 billion, and exports to €1.157 billion. The main export products are bananas, sugar and rum. Banana exports suffered in 2017 from damages due to Hurricane Irma and Hurricane Maria.

Tourism 
Tourism is the one of the most prominent sources of income, with most visitors coming from France and North America. An increasingly large number of cruise ships visit Guadeloupe, the cruise terminal of which is in Pointe-à-Pitre.

Agriculture 
The traditional sugar cane crop is slowly being replaced by other crops, such as bananas (which now supply about 50% of export earnings), eggplant, guinnep, noni, sapotilla, giraumon squash, yam, gourd, plantain, christophine, cocoa, jackfruit, pomegranate, and many varieties of flowers. Other vegetables and root crops are cultivated for local consumption, although Guadeloupe is dependent upon imported food, mainly from the rest of France.

Light industry 
Of the various light industries, sugar and rum production, solar energy, cement, furniture and clothing are the most prominent. Most manufactured goods and fuel are imported.

Culture

Language
Guadeloupe's official language is French, which is spoken by nearly all of the population. Most residents also speak Guadeloupean Creole, a French-based creole language.

Guadeloupean Creole emerged as a result of the need for all ethnic groups (French, African and Amerindian) to be able to understand each other. This language is therefore the result of a mixture created in the 17th century in response to a communicative emergency. At the time of the colony's foundation, a majority of the French population did not speak the standard French language but local dialects and languages, such as Breton and Norman, while the Africans came from a variety of West and Central African ethnic groups and lacked a common language themselves. The Creole language emerged as a lingua franca and ultimately became the native language of much of the population.

Moreover, Terre-de-Haut and Terre-de-Bas, in the Saintes archipelago, due to their settlement history (Breton, Norman and Poitevin settlers), have their own Creoles which differ from Guadeloupean Creole by their French pronunciations, their particular expressions, their syntax and their sonorities. Although it is not transcribed, these islanders call their Creole "patois" or "language of St. Martin" and actively ensure its transmission and perpetuation by their descendants in vernacular form.

A Guadeloupean béké first wrote Creole at the end of the 17th century, transcribing it using French orthography.

As Guadeloupe is a French department, French is the official language. However, Guadeloupean French (in contact with Creole) has certain linguistic characteristics that differ from those of standard metropolitan French. Recently, a very detailed study of the phonetic aspect of Guadeloupean French has been undertaken (this would be the first study to deal with both the acoustic and the phonological and perceptual aspects of Guadeloupean French in particular and West Indian French in general). It is also concerned with the reading varieties of Guadeloupean French (acrolect, mesolect and basilect).

In recent decades there has been a revival of Creole, which has stimulated the appearance of books of short stories and poetry published in Creole and French over the last ten years. In this context, Hector Poullet is a pioneer of Creole-mediated dictation. Creole is also a very colourful language and very philosophical in its expressions and phrases, which, translated literally into French, can be confusing. The representatives of the older generations are not always fluent in French, but in Guadeloupean Creole.

Today, the question as to whether French and Creole are stable in Guadeloupe, i.e. whether both languages are practised widely and competently throughout society, remains a subject of active research.

Religion

About 80% of the population is Roman Catholic. Guadeloupe is in the diocese of Basse-Terre (et Pointe-à-Pitre). Other major religions include various Protestant denominations. In 1685, the Black Code announced the Christian religion in its Catholic form as the only authorized religion in the French West Indies, thus excluding Jews and the various Protestant groups from practicing their beliefs, and imposed the forced conversion of the newly arrived slaves and the baptism of the older ones.

This was followed by a rapid fashion among the slaves, since this religion offered them a spiritual refuge and allowed them to safeguard some of their African beliefs and customs, thus marking the beginning of a religious syncretism. Since the 1970s, new religions and groups have been 'competing' with the Catholic Church, such as the Evangelical Pentecostal Church, the Seventh-day Adventist Church, the Bible Students or Jehovah's Witnesses and the Church of Jesus Christ of Latter-day Saints.

Administratively, the territory of Guadeloupe is part of the Diocese of Basse-Terre and Pointe-à-Pitre, attached to the Catholic Church in France. The diocese includes the territories of Guadeloupe, St. Barthélemy and St. Martin and the number of faithful is estimated at 400,000. In 2020 there were 59 priests active in the diocese. The episcopal see is located in Basse-Terre, in the cathedral of Notre-Dame-de-Guadeloupe.

Hinduism, which accompanied the Indians who came to work in Guadeloupe in the mid-19th century, has expanded since the 1980s. The Indian community has its own tradition that comes from India. It is the mayé men, a distorted pronunciation of the name of the Tamil Indian goddess Mariamman. There are no less than 400 temples in the archipelago. Islam made its appearance in the French West Indies in the 1970s, first in Martinique.

According to the president of the Muslim association of Guadeloupe, there are between 2,500 and 3,000 Muslims in the department. The island has two mosques. Judaism has been present in Guadeloupe since the arrival of Dutch settlers expelled from the northeast of present-day Brazil in 1654. There is a synagogue and an Israelite cultural community. Guadeloupeans of Syrian and Lebanese origin practice Catholicism in its Maronite form. Rastafari has been attractive to some young people since the 1970s following its emergence in Jamaica. The quimbois or kenbwa, practiced in Guadeloupe, refer to magical-religious practices derived from Christian and African syncretism.

Literature 

Guadeloupe has always had a rich literary output, with Guadeloupean author Saint-John Perse winning the 1960 Nobel Prize in Literature. Other prominent writers from Guadeloupe or of Guadeloupean descent include Maryse Condé, Simone Schwarz-Bart, Myriam Warner-Vieyra, Oruno Lara, Daniel Maximin, Paul Niger, Guy Tirolien and Nicolas-Germain Léonard.

Music

Music and dance are also very popular, and the interaction of African, French and Indian cultures has given birth to some original new forms specific to the archipelago, most notably zouk music. Since the 1970s, Guadeloupean music has increasingly claimed the local language, Guadeloupean Creole as the preferred language of popular music. Islanders enjoy many local dance styles including zouk, zouk-love, compas, as well as the modern international genres such as hip hop, etc.

Traditional Guadeloupean music includes biguine, kadans, cadence-lypso, and gwo ka. Popular music artists and bands such as Experience 7, Francky Vincent, Kassav' (which included Patrick St-Eloi, and Gilles Floro) embody the more traditional music styles of the island, whilst other musical artists such as the punk band The Bolokos (1) or Tom Frager focus on more international genres such as rock or reggae. Many international festivals take place in Guadeloupe, such as the Creole Blues Festival on Marie-Galante. All the Euro-French forms of art are also ubiquitous, enriched by other communities from Brazil, Dominican Republic, Haiti, India, Lebanon, Syria) who have migrated to the islands.

Classical music has seen a resurgent interest in Guadeloupe. One of the first known composers of African origin was born in Guadeloupe, Le Chevalier de Saint-Georges, a contemporary of Joseph Haydn and Wolfgang Amadeus Mozart, and a celebrated figure in Guadeloupe. Several monuments and cites are dedicated to Saint-Georges in Guadeloupe, and there is an annual music festival, Festival International de Musique Saint-Georges, dedicated in his honour. The festival attracts classical musicians from all over the world and is one of the largest classical music festivals in the Caribbean.Another element of Guadeloupean culture is its dress. A few women (particularly of the older generation) wear a unique style of traditional dress, with many layers of colourful fabric, now only worn on special occasions. On festive occasions they also wore a madras (originally a "kerchief" from South India) headscarf tied in many different symbolic ways, each with a different name. The headdress could be tied in the "bat" style, or the "firefighter" style, as well as the "Guadeloupean woman". Jewellery, mainly gold, is also important in the Guadeloupean lady's dress, a product of European, African and Indian inspiration.

Traditional dress 
Traditional dress, inherited today, is the result of a long cultural mix involving Africa, Asia and Europe. This cultural mix was initially based on triangular trade and later on a more globalized trade that included importing fabrics from the Orient. For example, in the traditional Guadeloupean costume, we find Asian influences with the use of madras cloth from India, African and European influences (Spanish in this case) with the use of the headscarf for covering and again European influences (French in this case) in the adoption of the lace petticoat from Brittany.

The clothing worn in Guadeloupe has mutated over the centuries and has undergone changes that reflect the social conditions and the evolution of society, from the time of slavery to the present day. During the second half of the 17th century, slaves arriving in Guadeloupe were naked or nearly naked. They were then forced to wear rags or the owner's worn-out clothes, which were quickly discarded, barely concealing their nakedness. Or slaves working in the fields wore the "three-hole" dress, made of a vegetable fiber fabric in which three holes were made (two for the arms and one for the head). Under pressure from the church and the authorities, slaves were forced to wear the "three-hole" dress.

Under pressure from the church and as soon as the Black Code was enforced in 1685, owners were required to provide "each slave with two suits of cloth or four alders [about ] of cloth a year... art.25" which only modestly improved their conditions. However, the poor quality of the clothing worn during slavery must be qualified, as it could vary according to the day of the week (daily clothing, Sunday clothing, clothing for special occasions), or according to the status of the slaves employed in the houses.

In fact, the latter could be dressed in clothes of different quality according to the job they performed on the property. For example, in the case of the maids, their clothes could be of better quality because they had to reflect the image of success and wealth that their master wanted to project.

From the 17th century onwards, the development of the Creole costume coincided with the desire of slave women to regain their dignity, with the evolution of their employment within the household or Guadeloupean society (specialization in the sewing and dressmaking trades), with the evolution of Guadeloupean society (free women of colour, freed slaves, mulatto women) and with the influence of the European fashionable costume, which the housewife represented.

After the abolition of slavery, the main periods of traditional Guadeloupean dress were the following:

 1848 to 1930, establishment of the use of the costume;
 From 1930 to 1950, significant decrease in the use of the traditional costume;
 From 1950 to 1960, period in which the traje becomes a "folkloric" garment;
 From 1960 to the present, the traditional costume has been recovered and is valued both as an everyday garment and as a sign of attachment to the culture of Guadalupe.53 Today, many designers are inspired by the traditional costume to make some of their creations.

As a result of this fusion of African and European dress codes over the centuries, including materials from distant origins, the Guadeloupean wardrobe includes Creole garments such as: the cozy dress or wòb ti-do, an everyday dress also called "à corps" because it fits the body like a corset; the skirt-shirt, in ceremonial dress (the shirt is made of very fine batiste trimmed with lace, which stops at the elbows and is buttoned with golden buttons. The skirt, full and very wide in the back with tail, is knotted above the breasts); the bodice dress which is distinguished from the others by the quantity and richness of the fabric used (satin, brocade satin, satin).

 The traditional headdress, worn with or without the women's traditional costume, is the subject of a precise codification:
 The "tête chaudière" is the ceremonial headdress with a round, flat shape, topped with a spiked knot;
 The four-pointed headdress (headdress with four knots) means "my heart has room for whoever wants it! ";
 The three-pointed headdress means "my heart is taken!".
 The two-pointed headdress means "my heart is compromised, but you can try your luck! ";
 The one-ended headdress means "my heart is free!"

Gastronomy 
Guadeloupean cuisine is a mixture of African, European and Asian influences. It uses first of all agricultural products such as poyo (plantain more commonly called green plantain or ti-nain), bread plantain, okra, cabbage, pigeon peas, cristofina, yam or sweet potato.

The sea and rivers provide rays, snappers, octopus (chatou), lambis, burgots (a type of large whelk), sea urchins and ouassous. Orchards provide fruits such as soursop, red jambosier, passion fruit (marakoudja), mango, quenette, and citrus. Condiments sometimes added to dishes are habanero chili, cive (a kind of onion from the country) or roucou seeds that give a red tint to sauces.

The cooking, often spicy and seasoned, results from soaking meat or fish for hours before cooking, to enhance its flavour. Typical dishes are: fish blaff, dombrés, bébélé (from Marie-Galante), colombo (equivalent to Indian curry) and matété (rice cooked with crab). And as for appetizers or snacks, there are morcillas criollas, accras, cassava cakes and bokit.

As for desserts, there are blancmange, sorbets or various fruit salads. As for pastries, you can choose from pâtés with jam, tournament d'amour (in Les Saintes), caca bœuf (in Marie-Galante) or sacristain. The "pain natté", which is a local brioche bread, is often eaten.

There are local productions of candied fruits (elderberry, pineapple, carambola) and jams (guava, banana, coconut). Sorbets such as coconut sherbet or snowball made with crushed ice to which a syrup (mint, grenadine) is added are also consumed. Sweets include coconut sugar, kilibibi and konkada (of Beninese origin).In the category of beverages, the consumption of soft drinks is very important in Guadeloupe, as well as that of a drink locally nicknamed black beer. In addition, it is not uncommon to see vendors of sugar cane juice or coconut water on the roads. Chaudeau is consumed on special occasions (weddings, baptisms, communions) and is a Guadeloupean-style eggnog eaten with a whipped cake (génoise). The rum, whose consumption is culturally imbricated in the Guadeloupean society, comes in particular from one of the ten distilleries distributed in the Guadeloupean territory and that produce the rums of Guadeloupe.

Festivities 
At Christmas, families and friends gather during the chanté Nwel, an opportunity to sing carols and celebrate. After the vacations, rehearsals begin for the Guadeloupe carnival. Carnival groups parade through the streets every Sunday afternoon until the Carnival festivities in February or March. For example, the groups with skins, the Akiyo group are groups composed only of large percussion and lambi shell instruments. They have the particularity of having no brass instruments in the band, no choreography, they often parade without themed costumes. Since 2014, the Carnival in kabwèt of Marie-Galante has been registered in the inventory of the intangible heritage of France at Unesco.

Shrove Tuesday is the big party where carnival groups compete in the main town, Basse-Terre, or in Pointe-à-Pitre, for the best costumes, the best music or the best choreography whose theme is imposed by the carnival committees. The next day, on Ash Wednesday, the day that ends the carnival, the mascot king of the carnival nicknamed Vaval is burned, which signals the end of the festivities, everyone parades in black and white (to mark Vaval's mourning), and then the forty days of Lent begin. Most of the population is Catholic and respects this period. But, given the great fondness for festivities, on the "Thursday of Lent" a parade is organized in red and black identical to that of Carnival, with groups of musicians preceded by people parading.

After this period of deprivation, the Easter celebrations take place, during which families usually go camping on the beach and eat traditional and very popular dishes based on crabs: matété (rice cooked with crab), calalou (crabs with wooden leaves accompanied by white rice) or dombrés with crabs (small balls of flour cooked with crab).

Sport 

Football is popular in Guadeloupe, and several notable footballers are of Guadeloupean origin, including Marius Trésor, Stéphane Auvray, Ronald Zubar and his younger brother Stéphane, Miguel Comminges, Dimitri Foulquier, Bernard Lambourde, Anthony Martial, Alexandre Lacazette, Thierry Henry, Lilian Thuram, William Gallas, Layvin Kurzawa, Mikael Silvestre, Thomas Lemar, Mathys Tel and Kingsley Coman.

The Guadeloupe football team were 2007 CONCACAF Gold Cup semi-finalists, defeated by Mexico.

Basketball is popular. Best known players are the NBA players Rudy Gobert, Mickaël Piétrus, Johan Petro, Rodrigue Beaubois, and Mickael Gelabale (now playing in Russia), who were born on the island.

Several track and field athletes, such as Marie-José Pérec, Patricia Girard-Léno, Christine Arron, and Wilhem Belocian, are also Guadeloupe natives.

The island has produced many world-class fencers. Yannick Borel, Daniel Jérent, Ysaora Thibus, Anita Blaze, Enzo Lefort and Laura Flessel were all born and raised in Guadeloupe. According to olympic gold medalist and world champion Yannick Borel, there is a good fencing school and a culture of fencing in Guadeloupe.

Even though Guadeloupe is part of France, it has its own sports teams. Rugby union is a small but rapidly growing sport in Guadeloupe.

The island is internationally known for hosting the Karujet Race – Jet Ski World Championship since 1998. This nine-stage, four-day event attracts competitors from around the world (mostly Caribbeans, Americans, and Europeans). The Karujet, generally made up of seven races around the island, has an established reputation as one of the most difficult championships in which to compete.

The Route du Rhum is one of the most prominent nautical French sporting events, occurring every four years.

Bodybuilder Serge Nubret was born in Anse-Bertrand, Grande-Terre, representing the French state in various bodybuilding competitions throughout the 1960s and 1970s including the IFBB's Mr. Olympia contest, taking 3rd place every year from 1972 to 1974, and 2nd place in 1975. Bodybuilder Marie-Laure Mahabir also hails from Guadeloupe.

The country has a passion for cycling. It hosted the French Cycling Championships in 2009 and continues to host the Tour de Guadeloupe every year.

Guadeloupe continues to host the Orange Open de Guadeloupe tennis tournament (since 2011).

The Tour of Guadeloupe sailing, which was founded in 1981.

In boxing, Ludovic Proto - as an amateur, he competed in the 1988 Summer Olympics in the men's light welterweight division. As a professional, he was a former French and European welterweight champion;

Gilbert Delé - as a professional, he was a former French and European light-middleweight champion, then he won the WBA world light-middleweight title in 1991;

Jean-Marc Mormeck - as a professional, he was a former French light heavyweight champion and two-time unified world cruiserweight champion—held the WBA, WBC, and The Ring titles twice between 2005 and 2007).

Transport

Guadeloupe is served by a number of airports; most international flights use Pointe-à-Pitre International Airport. Boats and cruise ships frequent the islands, using the ports at Pointe-à-Pitre and Basse-Terre.

On 9 September 2013 the county government voted in favour of constructing a tramway in Pointe-à-Pitre. The first phase will link northern Abymes to downtown Pointe-à-Pitre by 2019. The second phase, scheduled for completion in 2023, will extend the line to serve the university.

Education 
The Guadeloupe academic region includes only the Guadeloupe academy. It employs 9,618 people and its operating budget was €714.3 million for 2018–2019. The territory has 300 elementary schools, including 1 private kindergarten under contract and 14 private elementary schools under contract. It also has 52 middle schools, including 6 private under contract. And finally, it has 38 high schools, 13 of which are private under contract.

During the 2018–2019 school year were enrolled at Guadeloupe Academy:

 45,510 students in primary education;
 45,626 students in secondary education;
 2,718 graduate students in high school.
 Since 2014, the academy has 12 districts divided into 5 poles:
 The Pôle Îles du Nord (St. Martin and St. Barthélemy);
 The Basse-Terre Nord Pole (Baie-Mahault, Capesterre-Belle-Eau and Sainte-Rose) ;
 The South Pole of Basse-Terre: Basse-Terre and Bouillante (including the islands of Les Saintes);
 The North Pole of Grande-Terre: Grande-Terre Nord, Sainte-Anne and Saint-François (including the islands of La Désirade and Marie-Galante);
 The South Pole of Grande-Terre: Les Abymes, Gosier and Pointe-à-Pitre.

The islands of Guadeloupe also have two local campuses of the University of the West Indies (Fouillole and Camp Jacob), a "city of knowledge" including a health and social campus, a "university of trades" including a training centre for apprentices (CFA), a regional arts and entertainment centre, a student residence and, finally, three sites of the regional deuxième chance school.

Infrastructure

Energy 
The island has great potential for solar, wind and marine energy, but by 2018, biomass and coal energy and petroleum hydrocarbons are still the most used.

The Energy transition Law (TECV) provides for 50% renewable energy by 2020 in the territory. And the Guadeloupe EPP plans to develop 66 MW of additional biomass capacity between 2018 and 2023, including 43 MW to replace coal.

For example, the Albioma Caraïbes (AC) coal-fired power plant will be converted to biomass to help increase the share of renewables in Guadeloupe's energy mix from 20.5% to 35%, thereby mitigating the island's dependence on fossil fuels and reducing acidic air pollution and the production of toxic and bottom ash.

This 34 MW power plant, producing 260 GWh/year of electricity in 2018 (i.e. 15% of the island's needs), should reduce 265 000 t of  equivalent/year throughout the chain (−87% once converted to biomass compared to the previous situation, coal).

Guadeloupe has an electricity production plant, in Le Moule, based on the sugar cane agricultural sector, which recovers the residues from sugar cane crushing (bagasse) to produce energy; 12 wind farms, such as in Désirade, Le Moule or Marie-Galante; a geothermal power plant in Bouillante, which uses the energy of water vapor produced by volcanic activity (the plant's electricity production ranks it first nationally); a project to harness the energy of waves and ocean currents; photovoltaic installations that contribute to the operation of solar water heaters for homes and to the development of the electric vehicle sector.

Electricity produced by hydropower, which represents 2.2% of total production, comes from dams built on the beds of certain rivers.

Drinking water supply 
The water distributed by Guadeloupe's drinking water network comes mainly from Basse Terre, 70% from river intakes and 20% from spring catchments. The remaining 10% comes from boreholes tapping the groundwater of Grande Terre and Marie-Galante.

Access to water and sanitation is problematic due to the deteriorated state of the network, which causes many losses in the water supply system. For years, water shortages have been recurrent and have forced "water shifts", mainly in the municipalities of Grande-Terre, which are the most affected, with consequences for private individuals and agricultural activities.

According to statistics from the Water Office (2020 data), 61% of drinking water production is wasted, i.e. almost 50 million cubic metres of water per year, due to pipes in poor condition. In addition, 70% of wastewater treatment plants do not meet standards.

Police and crime 
Although Guadeloupe is one of the safest islands in the Caribbean, it was the most violent overseas French department in 2016. The murder rate is slightly more than that of Paris, at 8.2 per 100,000. The high level of unemployment caused violence and crime to rise, especially in 2009 and 2010, the years following the Great Recession. Residents of Guadeloupe describe the island as a place with little everyday crime, and most violence is caused by the drug trade or domestic disputes. In 2021, additional police officers were deployed to the island in the face of rioting arising out of COVID-19 restrictions.

Normally, about 2,000 police officers are present on the island including some 760 active National Gendarmerie of the COMGEND (Gendarmerie Command of Guadeloupe) region plus around 260 reservists. The active Gendarmerie include three Mobile Gendarmerie Squadrons (EGM) and a Republican Guard Intervention Platoon (PIGR). The Maritime Gendarmerie deploys the patrol boat Violette in the territory, which is planned for replacement by a new PCG patrol boat in about 2025–2026.

See also

 Bibliography of Guadeloupe
 Index of Guadeloupe-related articles
 List of colonial and departmental heads of Guadeloupe
 Overseas departments and territories of France
 Slavery in the Caribbean

References

Further reading
 Haigh, Sam – An Introduction to Caribbean Francophone Writing: Guadeloupe and Martinique.
 Jennings, Eric T. – Vichy in the Tropics: Petain’s National Revolution in Madagascar, Guadeloupe, and Indochina, 1940–1944.
 Noble, G. K. – The Resident Birds of Guadeloupe.
 Paiewonsky, Michael – Conquest of Eden, 1493–1515: Other Voyages of Columbus; Guadeloupe, Puerto Rico, Hispaniola, Virgin Islands.
 Roche, Jean-Claude – Oiseau des Antilles. Vol. 1, The Lesser Antilles from Grenada to Guadeloupe.

External links

 Prefecture website 
 Regional Council website 
 Departmental Council website 

 
Dependent territories in the Caribbean
Overseas departments of France
French Caribbean
Leeward Islands (Caribbean)
Lesser Antilles
Regions of France
Outermost regions of the European Union
Former British colonies and protectorates in the Americas
British Caribbean
Former Swedish colonies
Former colonies in North America
French Union
Island countries
French-speaking countries and territories
Populated places established in the 4th century
1674 establishments in the French colonial empire
1674 establishments in North America
1759 disestablishments in the French colonial empire
1759 disestablishments in North America
1759 establishments in the British Empire
1759 establishments in North America
1763 disestablishments in the British Empire
1763 disestablishments in North America
1763 establishments in the French colonial empire
1763 establishments in North America
1810 establishments in the British Empire
1810 disestablishments in the French colonial empire
1810 disestablishments in North America
1810 establishments in North America
1816 disestablishments in the British Empire
1816 disestablishments in North America
1816 establishments in the French colonial empire
1816 establishments in North America